Tenika Willison (born 7 December 1997) is a New Zealand rugby sevens player. She plays for Chiefs Manawa in the Super Rugby Aupiki competition. She also plays for the Black Ferns sevens internationally and won a gold medal at the Tokyo Olympics.

Rugby career 
Willison competed for New Zealand in the women's sevens tournament at the 2020 Summer Olympics where she won a gold medal.

Willison was named in the Black Ferns Sevens squad for the 2022 Commonwealth Games in Birmingham. She won a bronze medal at the event. She later competed in her second Rugby World Cup Sevens in Cape Town and won a silver medal.

Willison was signed by Chiefs Manawa for the 2023 Super Rugby Aupiki season.

References

External links
 

1997 births
Living people
New Zealand female rugby sevens players
New Zealand women's international rugby sevens players
Female rugby sevens players
Olympic rugby sevens players of New Zealand
Rugby sevens players at the 2020 Summer Olympics
Place of birth missing (living people)
People educated at Hamilton Girls' High School
Olympic gold medalists for New Zealand
Medalists at the 2020 Summer Olympics
Olympic medalists in rugby sevens
Commonwealth Games medallists in rugby sevens
Commonwealth Games gold medallists for New Zealand
Rugby sevens players at the 2018 Commonwealth Games
20th-century New Zealand women
21st-century New Zealand women
Rugby sevens players at the 2022 Commonwealth Games
Medallists at the 2018 Commonwealth Games